is a former Japanese football player.

Playing career
Matsumoto was born in Minato, Tokyo on September 5, 1983. He joined J1 League club Kyoto Purple Sanga from youth team in 2002. He debuted in October and played several matches as center back in 2002 season. However he could only play 1 match in 2003 and Sanga was relegated to J2 League end of 2003 season. He moved to J1 club FC Tokyo (2004) and Vissel Kobe (2005). However he could not play at all in the match in both clubs. In 2006, he moved to J2 club Shonan Bellmare. He became a regular player in 2006. However his opportunity to play decreased from 2007 and he could hardly play in the match in 2008. In June 2008, he moved to Tokushima Vortis and became a regular player soon. However he could not play at all in the match for injury from September and left the club end of 2008 season. In September 2009, he joined Japan Football League club MIO Biwako Kusatsu. However he could not play at all in the match and retired end of 2009 season.

Club statistics

References

External links

sports.geocities.jp

1983 births
Living people
Association football people from Tokyo
Japanese footballers
J1 League players
J2 League players
Japan Football League players
Kyoto Sanga FC players
FC Tokyo players
Vissel Kobe players
Shonan Bellmare players
Tokushima Vortis players
MIO Biwako Shiga players
Association football defenders